There are over 20,000 Grade II* listed buildings in England. This page is a list of these buildings in the metropolitan borough of Leeds in West Yorkshire.

Lists

|}

Notes

	
	

 
 
Listed
Lists of Grade II* listed buildings in West Yorkshire